"Dilbar" is a Bollywood song, originally released as part of the soundtrack for the 1999 Indian film Sirf Tum. The songs was originally composed by Nadeem-Shravan and sung by Alka Yagnik, with lyrics by Sameer. The song's original music video features Sushmita Sen and Sanjay Kapoor. The Sirf Tum soundtrack album sold 2.2million units, and was the ninth best-selling Bollywood music album of 1999.

The song was recreated for the 2018 film Satyameva Jayate, recomposed by Tanishk Bagchi with Middle-Eastern influences, and sung by Neha Kakkar, Asees Kaur and  Dhvani Bhanushali. Its music video is an item number, featuring  Bollywood actress/dancer Nora Fatehi performing Egyptian belly dancing. The song later had an Arabic language version, sung by Nora Fatehi with Moroccan hip hop group Fnaire, released on 30 November 2018.

Satyameva Jayate version

The recreated version of the song was released with the title "Dilbar" in Satyameva Jayate under the banner of T-Series on 3 July 2018. It was written by Shabbir Ahmed and Ikka Singh, composed by Tanishk Bagchi, choreographed by Adil Shaikh and Nora Fatehi and sung by Neha Kakkar and Dhvani Bhanushali, with rapping by Ikka Singh. Bagchi made use of the Oud, a fretless Middle-Eastern stringed instrument, along with Arabic drums to re-envision the classic song for the new film.

The music video of this song features Moroccan-Canadian dancer Nora Fatehi in an item number. The video heavily references Arabic culture, and the actor John Abraham also makes an appearance. In the music video, Nora Fatehi performs belly dancing, an Arabic dance style that was previously featured in a number of popular Bollywood item numbers, performed by actresses such as Helen in "Mehbooba O Mehbooba" from Sholay (1975), Zeenat Aman in "Raqqasa Mera Naam" from The Great Gambler (1979), Mallika Sherawat in "Mayya Mayya" from Guru (2007), and Rani Mukerji in "Aga Bai" from Aiyyaa (2012).

Reception
The remake received 20 million views on the first day of its YouTube release. It became the first Indian song to reach number three on the Billboard YouTube Music Chart. The Satyameva Jayate version of the song has received about 1.2billion views on YouTube, making it one of the most-viewed song on the T-Series YouTube channel.

Devansh Sharma from Firstpost remarked, "The soul of the new track is Neha Kakkar who brings a sensual-yet-never-raunchy appeal through her vocals. Her range allows her to switch from the meditative stanzas to the uninhibited chorus like a chameleon." Shravan Shah from Missmalini said, "The original one was done so well and is so engraved in our hearts that the reprise version just doesn’t match up to it." Nora's belly dancing has received wide praise, but the song has also received some mixed reactions from fans of the original song.

Arabic Dilbar

"Arabic Dilbar" is the Arabic language version of this song, featuring a mix of three languages (Arabic, Hindi, and French), was released on 30 November 2018 under the banner of T-Series. Nora Fatehi made her debut as a singer in this song, as a collaboration with Moroccan hip hop group . The song was composed by Mohcine Tizaf, with lyrics by Khalifa Mennani and Achraf Aarab, and the performance in the video for the release was choreographed by Caeser Gonsalves.

Whereas the Satyameva Jayate music video heavily referenced Arabic culture, the music video for the Arabic version instead heavily references Indian culture. In contrast to the Arabic belly dancing in the Satyameva Jayate video, Nora Fatehi and Fnaire instead perform standard Bollywood dance routines in the Arabic version.

Reception
According to Zee News, "The song easily crossed 100 million views on YouTube within days of its release and no sooner was the social media flooded with several mashups and dance videos." Srishti Kapoor of Mumbai Mirror said, "Her debut song as a pop artist in the Middle East and North Africa, just like the original, will make one want to dance. What makes it unique though, is the use of Moroccan instruments."

References

1999 songs
2018 songs
Alka Yagnik songs
Arabic-language songs
French-language songs
Hindi film songs
Hindi-language songs
Moroccan songs
Macaronic songs
Neha Kakkar songs
Dhvani Bhanushali songs
Pop-folk songs
Songs written for films